SM UB-104 was a German Type UB III submarine or U-boat in the German Imperial Navy during World War I. She was commissioned into the German Imperial Navy on 15 March 1918 as SM UB-104.

UB-104 was sunk by mine in at the Northern Barrage on 19 September 1918.

Construction

She was built by Blohm & Voss of Hamburg and following just under a year of construction, launched at Hamburg on 1 September 1917. UB-104 was commissioned later the same year under the command of Oblt.z.S. Ernst Berlin. Like all Type UB III submarines, UB-104 carried 10 torpedoes and was armed with a  deck gun. UB-104 had a displacement of  while surfaced and  when submerged. Her engines enabled her to travel at  when surfaced and  when submerged.

Summary of raiding history

References

Notes

Citations

Bibliography 

 

German Type UB III submarines
World War I submarines of Germany
U-boats commissioned in 1918
1917 ships
Ships built in Hamburg
U-boats sunk in 1918
U-boats sunk by mines
World War I shipwrecks in the North Sea
Ships lost with all hands
Maritime incidents in 1918